The 2014–15 Idaho State Bengals women's basketball team represented Idaho State University during the 2014–15 NCAA Division I women's basketball season. The Bengals, led by seventh year head coach Seton Sobolewski, played ten of their home games at Reed Gym. They were members of the Big Sky Conference. They finished the season 13–17, 8–10 in Big Sky play to finish in a tie for eighth place. They failed to qualify for the Big Sky women's tournament.

Schedule

|-
!colspan=9 style="background:#000000; color:#FF8300;"| Exhibition

|-
!colspan=9 style="background:#000000; color:#FF8300;"| Regular Season

See also
2014–15 Idaho State Bengals men's basketball team

References

Idaho State Bengals women's basketball seasons
Idaho State